Erika Prado is an American women's soccer midfielder of Mexican descent, And had played for Energiya Voronezh in the Russian Championship.

She previously played in W-League's Pali Blues and FC Indiana.

References

1984 births
Living people
American women's soccer players
Pali Blues players
USL W-League (1995–2015) players
Women's association football midfielders
Pasadena City College alumni
California State University, Los Angeles alumni
F.C. Indiana players
FC Energy Voronezh players
Expatriate women's footballers in Russia
American expatriate sportspeople in Russia
21st-century American women